Mount Tarampa is a rural locality in the Somerset Region, Queensland, Australia.

Geography 
Lockyer Creek forms the southern and eastern boundary of the locality. Although the locality is predominantly flat farming land, there is a local prominence (also called Mount Tarampa) of 150 metres in the southern part of the locality.

History 
Mount Tarampa Provisional School opened on 23 July 1906, becoming Mount Tarampa State School on 1 January 1909.

In the  Mount Tarampa had a population of 481 people.

Education 
Mount Tarampa State School is a government co-educational primary school (P-6) at 9 Profkes Road. In 2016, the school had an enrolment of 44 students with 4 teachers (3 equivalent full-time) and 6 non-teaching staff (3 equivalent full-time).

Heritage listings 
Mount Tarampa has the following heritage-listed sites:
 9 Profkes Road: Mount Tarampa State School

References

External links 

Suburbs of Somerset Region
Localities in Queensland